QL may refer to:

 .QL, an object-oriented query language used to retrieve data from relational database management systems
 QL (chemical), the chemical isopropyl aminoethylmethyl phosphonite, a precursor to the nerve agent VX (NATO code)
 Quadratus lumborum muscle, a muscle in the lower back
 Query language, computer languages used to make queries into databases and information systems
 ATCvet code QL (Antineoplastic and immunomodulating agents), a section of the Anatomical Therapeutic Chemical Classification System for veterinary medicinal products
 Sinclair QL, a 1980s home and personal computer by Sinclair Research
 Bedford QL, a three-ton military 4x4 truck by Bedford Vehicles
 Philips QL, an induction lighting system by Philips; see electrodeless lamp
 Le Québécois Libre, a political webzine
 Queensland, Australia
 Queen Latifah, American hip-hop artist, singer and Oscar-nominated actress